Yann Yves Laurent Bodiger (born 9 February 1995) is a French professional footballer who plays as a midfielder for Spanish club Granada CF.

Club career
Bodiger is a youth exponent from Toulouse. He made his Ligue 1 debut at 9 August 2014 against OGC Nice.

On 14 May 2016, the last match day of the 2015–2016 season, Bodiger scored his first goal for the club in the 80th minute against Angers to win the match 3–2. His goal ensured that Toulouse remained in Ligue 1, finishing the season in 17th place with 40 points, just one point above the relegation zone.

In January 2019, Bodiger was loaned to Córdoba CF from Toulouse. On 15 July, he signed with fellow Segunda División side Cádiz CF on a two-year contract.

On 1 February 2021, Bodiger terminated his contract with the Yellow Submarine, and moved to second division side CD Castellón just hours later. After the latter's relegation, he agreed to a one-year deal with FC Cartagena.

On 21 June 2022, after being an undisputed starter for Cartagena, Bodiger signed a two-year contract with Granada CF, freshly relegated to the second level.

Career statistics

References

External links

 

Living people
1995 births
People from Sète
Sportspeople from Hérault
Association football midfielders
French footballers
France youth international footballers
France under-21 international footballers
Ligue 1 players
Toulouse FC players
La Liga players
Segunda División players
Córdoba CF players
Cádiz CF players
CD Castellón footballers
FC Cartagena footballers
Granada CF footballers
French expatriate footballers
French expatriate sportspeople in Spain
Expatriate footballers in Spain
Footballers from Occitania (administrative region)